How to Love (Swedish: Konsten att älska) is a 1947 Swedish drama film directed by Gunnar Skoglund and starring Sture Lagerwall, Wanda Rothgardt and Lauritz Falk. It was shot at the Råsunda Studios in Stockholm. The film's sets were designed by the art director Nils Svenwall.

Cast
 Sture Lagerwall as 	Pelle Lind
 Wanda Rothgardt as Monica Lind
 Ingegerd Westin as	Gudrun
 Sten-Åke Lindström as 	Lasse
 Björn Montin as Bosse
 Lauritz Falk as 	Wilhelm Acker
 Cécile Ossbahr as Maja-Vivan Willer
 Elsa Carlsson as Ebba Lindgren von Hacken
 Naima Wifstrand as Vera Stätt
 Agneta Prytz as 	Ms. Pimpernel
 Marianne Gyllenhammar as Ms. Tillman
 Ilse-Nore Tromm as 	Anna
 Elsa Ebbesen as 	Wilhelm Acker's Housekeeper
 Kerstin Holmberg as 	Mannequin
 Ellika Mann as 	Mannequin
 Greta Blom as 	Brita Andersson
 Marie-Louise Martins as 	Telephone Operator
 Sif Ruud as	Lotten
 Ruth Weijden as 	Lotten's Mother
 Tord Stål as 	Berglund
 Gunnar Nielsen as 	Nilsson
 Åke Engfeldt as 	Tailor
 Rune Stylander as Studio Photographer
 Robert Ryberg as Lundgren 
 Arne Lindblad as 	Maitre D'
 Bo Lindström as 	Policeman

References

Bibliography 
 Krawc, Alfred. International Directory of Cinematographers, Set- and Costume Designers in Film: Denmark, Finland, Norway, Sweden (from the beginnings to 1984). Saur, 1986.
 Qvist, Per Olov & von Bagh, Peter. Guide to the Cinema of Sweden and Finland. Greenwood Publishing Group, 2000.

External links 
 

1947 films
Swedish drama films
1947 drama films
1940s Swedish-language films
Films directed by Gunnar Skoglund
Swedish black-and-white films
1940s Swedish films